La Playa Airport ,  is an airport serving the Celulosa Arauco y Constitución wood products plant.

See also

Transport in Chile
List of airports in Chile

References

External links
OpenStreetMap - La Playa
OurAirports - La Playa
FallingRain - La Playa Airport

Airports in Biobío Region